The 1930 United States Senate election in Maine was held on September 8, 1930. Incumbent Republican U.S. Senator Arthur Gould, who had been elected to complete the term of the late Senator Bert Fernald, did not run for re-election to a full term.

In the Republican primary, U.S. Representative Wallace H. White Jr. defeated former Governor of Maine Owen Brewster. White easily won the general election over Democrat Frank Haskell.

White and Brewster would later serve together as Senate colleagues from 1941 to 1949.

Republican primary

Candidates
Owen Brewster, former Governor of Maine from 1925 to 1929 
Dugald B. Dewar
Wallace H. White Jr., U.S. Representative from Lewiston

Results

Democratic primary

Candidates
Frank Haskell, candidate for U.S. Representative from Portland in 1920

Results
Haskell was unopposed for the Democratic nomination.

General election

Results

See also 
 1930 United States Senate elections

References

Maine
1930